Richard Coke Jr. (November 16, 1790March 31, 1851) was a nineteenth-century congressman and lawyer from Virginia. He was the uncle of politician Richard Coke.

Born in Williamsburg, Virginia, Coke pursued in preparatory studies as a young man. He graduated from the College of William and Mary, studied law and was admitted to the bar, commencing practice in Gloucester County, Virginia. He owned slaves.  He was elected a Jacksonian to the United States House of Representatives in 1828, serving from 1829 to 1833. Coke died at his plantation called "Abingdon Place" in Gloucester County, Virginia on March 31, 1851 and was interred in the family cemetery on the estate.

External links

Richard Coke, Jr. at The Political Graveyard

1790 births
1851 deaths
Politicians from Williamsburg, Virginia
American people of English descent
Jacksonian members of the United States House of Representatives from Virginia
Virginia lawyers
American planters
American slave owners
College of William & Mary alumni